The Muslim Raibhat or Raibhaat are a Muslim community found in North India they also known as bhaat and Sheikh in Islam. They are converts to Islam from the Rai Bhatt or Raibhaat community. The Muslim Rai Bhatt or Raibhaat are the heredity bards and genealogists of many communities in India. A small number are also found in the city of Karachi in Pakistan, where they now form a component of the Muhajir community. Muslim Rai Bhatt or Raibhaat  is not only in Uttar Pradesh but is registered in the Indian Gazette all over India but according to the state, all are placed in different categories.

History and origin   
The etymology of the word Rai Bhatt means the great Bhatt, as Rai means great in Hindi. The Rai Bhatt claims descent from Kavi Rishi, a Muslim Rai Bhatt or Raibhaat 

human son of the god Brahma. The Hindu sages Sutra Rishi, Sanjay Bhatt and Arya Bhatt are said to belong to this community. They claim to be Brahmin by origin. The Raibhat claim descent from Chandra Bardai, a bard at the court of the last Hindu ruler of North India, Prithvi Raj Chauhan. The community have two sub-divisions, Brahm Bhatt and Taga Bhatt. They consider themselves to be of Shaikh status, being Muslim converts from the Brahmin community.

Present circumstances   

The community were historically tribal bards and genealogists. The community is now mainly made of small peasant farmers, traders and government servants. They cultivate wheat, sorghum, paddy, maize, pulses and vegetables. In villages, they are sharecroppers. They also performed folks songs at wedding, but this activity has been discarded.

The Muslim Rai Bhatt or Raibhaat have no community council. They are endogamous community, preferring to marry parallel-cousins. The traditional division between Taga Bhatt and Braham Bhatt remains. They are found mainly in the districts of Gonda Balrampur Basti Bahraich Lucknow sitapur Barabanki Faizabad Allahabad etc. Saharanpur, Muzzafarnagar, Meerut, Bulandshahr, Ghaziabad, Aligarh,Hapur and Agra.  Outside Uttar Pradesh, they are found in Delhi and Haryana.

References   

Social groups of Pakistan
Social groups of Uttar Pradesh
Social groups of Madhya Pradesh
Social groups of Bihar
Muslim communities of India
Shaikh clans
Mulla Brahmins
Muslim communities of Uttar Pradesh